Mont Revard is a mountain in the Bauges Massif near Aix-les-Bains in Savoie, France. The mountain is crossed by the D913 road between the villages of Saint-Jean-d'Arvey and Pugny-Chatenod near Aix-les-Bains. 
 
The Tour de France had crossed the pass twice previously and has had a stage finish twice on the summit.

Climate
Mont Revard features a warm-summer humid continental climate (Köppen: Dfb) due to its altitude and far inland position. The climate can also be qualified as mountainous and the seasons are well marked.

Located at the western end of the french Alps, Mont Revard receives a lot of precipitation over the year and significant accumulations of snow, up to  during the winter of 2012-2013. Summers are quite warm and sunny but thunderstorms are not uncommon while winters are very cold and snowy.

Details of the climb

Caving 
The limestone plateau is conducive to karst formations. In the Bauges massif, collapse wells and snow pits are called tannes; they sometimes give access to active underground networks, such as the Garde-Cavale network accessible in particular from the Trou du Garde and the Creux de la Cavale. This network totals a development of more than 50 km explored. The waters come out at the cave of the Doria, whose flow varies from 14 l / s to 7 m3 / s, cave visible from Chambéry.

Tour de France 
The latter stage was neutralized in the wake of the 1998 Festina affair.

The 1965 stage was a mountain time trial won by Felice Gimondi.

Appearances in Tour de France

Tour de France stage finishes

References

External links 
Mont Revard on Google Maps (Tour de France classic climbs)

Mountains of Savoie
Mountains of the Alps